Salomé Barojas Romero (born June 16, 1957, in Córdoba, Veracruz) is a Mexican former relief pitcher in Major League Baseball who played for the Chicago White Sox, Seattle Mariners, and Philadelphia Phillies from  to .

Career
Barojas was an integral part of the  Chicago White Sox team which won the American League West division – the first White Sox team to make it to postseason play since .

His performance includes 17 seasons in the Mexican Summer League. He finished with 115 wins and only 58 defeats for a magnificent .665 percentage, the second highest figure in the history of the circuit. He played four years with Cordoba, two Reynosa and 11 in Mexico. At the time of retreat was the best in ERA with 2.89. He had five years with more than 10 wins.

Best campaigns were 1978, 81, 87, 88 and 91 respectively. In 78 he was with 8-3 and 2.45 ERA playing with Cordoba. In 81 he finished with 12.03 and 3.03 in the 87 to 13.04 and 3.10 in the 88 to 14.04 and 3.14 and 91 at 10-1 and 2.44, all those years in Mexico. He pitched 543 games, started 85 and finished 30. The Veracruz was a great relief because he managed 152 rescues. He pitched 1,406 innings with a third, struck out 773 enemies and gave 648 walks.

In 1981 he shared the lead with win–loss record 12-3 (.800) being part of the Red Devils. In '91 he led won and lost with 10-1 (.909) playing with Mexico. He played five years in the major leagues. Two and a half years with the Chicago White Sox, one and a half with the Seattle Mariners and the other with the Philadelphia Phillies.

In the Mexican Pacific he won 51 games and lost 39. In 1989–1990 to Mazatlan was saves leader with 17. He is fourth in saves with 53. It is ranked 14th in effectiveness of all time with 2.68.

Barojas was one of New York Yankees public address announcer Bob Sheppard's favorite names to announce.

References

External links

Salomé Barojas at SABR (Baseball BioProject)
Salomé Barojas at Baseball Almanac
Salomé Barojas at Baseballbiography.com

1957 births
Living people
Baseball players from Veracruz
Broncos de Reynosa players
Cafeteros de Córdoba players
Chicago White Sox players
Denver Zephyrs players
Diablos Rojos del México players
Major League Baseball pitchers
Major League Baseball players from Mexico
Mexican Baseball Hall of Fame inductees
Mexican expatriate baseball players in the United States
Mexican League baseball pitchers
Minor league baseball managers
Sportspeople from Córdoba, Veracruz
Philadelphia Phillies players
Seattle Mariners players
Tomateros de Culiacán players